Jonathan Welsh (April 3, 1947 – January 27, 2005) was a Canadian actor of stage, television and film, best known for his principal roles in Canadian television series, notably the 1986–1989 adventure comedy Adderly and the 1989–1994 journalism drama E.N.G..

Career 
On E.N.G., Welsh portrayed Eric "Mac" MacFarlane, one of the first openly gay characters in North American series television, a source of considerable pride for the actor.

He also appeared in the 1979 movie City on Fire which was Canada's attempt to enter the disaster movie era. The movie was a critical and box office failure. His other film credits included roles in Agency (1980), Nothing Personal (1980), All in Good Taste (1983) and The Surrogate (1984).

His acting career began in theatre in the 1960s, with roles at the Shaw and Stratford festivals and in the 1969 Canadian debut of Hair at the Royal Alexandra Theatre.

In 1990, Welsh founded Performers for Literacy, an acclaimed national charity that encourages children to read with interactive shows and readings, and with Second Story Reading Centres in Toronto and Edmonton.

Personal life 
Toward the end of his life, he moved from Toronto to Belleville, Ontario, where he died in his sleep after a short illness. He was survived by his wife Heather and three children, Hilary, Owen and Julia.

Filmography

Film

Television

References

External links
 
 Performers for Literacy

1947 births
2005 deaths
Canadian male stage actors
Canadian male television actors
Canadian male film actors
Best Supporting Actor in a Drama Series Canadian Screen Award winners